Cyclostrema bibi is a species of sea snail, a marine gastropod mollusk in the family Liotiidae.

Description
The height of the shell attains 4.4 mm.

Distribution
This species occurs in the Caribbean Sea off Cuba at depths between 30 m and 40 m.

References

 Espinosa J., Ortea J., Fernandez-Garcés R. & Moro L. (2007) Adiciones a la fauna de moluscos marinos de la peninsula de Guanahacabibes (I), con la descripcion de nuevas especies. Avicennia 19: 63–88. page(s): 66

bibi
Gastropods described in 2007